Comet is a wooden roller coaster at Hersheypark in Hershey, Pennsylvania. It is located in the Hollow section of Hersheypark, next to Skyrush. Built in 1946 by the Philadelphia Toboggan Coasters (PTC) of Philadelphia, Pennsylvania, the coaster features a double out and back track layout. When built it was jointly owned by Hershey Park and PTC.

History
Comet opened in 1946. In 1964, Comet received 6,650 individual 10-watt chaser lights. In 1994, Comet received 2 new trains named "Mork's Comet" and "Halley's Comet". One of the old trains is currently used as seating at the Hershey Museum, and the other was donated to the National Roller Coaster Museum and Archives.

Comet was re-tracked during the off-season in 2006, and new seat belts were added two years later. Comet was repainted the same color white, and the station was redone, during the 2012 off-season. Two years later, the lift hill was rehabilitated and straightened, removing the well known "kink" that was in the lift hill.

Ride experience

Comet goes up a  lift, then drops  at a 47-degree angle. After the first drop, the car goes up a hill and then makes a left 180-degree turn. The car drops back down another hill, goes up a small hill, and then up a larger hill, making another 180-degree turn. After the turn, there is another drop and then the track makes a right turn ("dog leg"), going through several bunny hills before another left 180-degree turn. Following the second set of bunny hills is a left turn and two bunny hills, then the car slows into the station.

The car usually sits for a few moments before coming around into the station because of an extra set of brakes that served as an unloading point until Comet was renovated to its current "spill 'n fill" operation.

Reception 
A magazine in the 1970s proclaimed Comet to be among the top 15 roller coasters in the U.S. By 1996, Comet was the second-most-ridden attraction at Hersheypark, behind Coal Cracker.

References

Hersheypark
Roller coasters in Pennsylvania
Roller coasters introduced in 1946
1946 establishments in Pennsylvania